Palgrave  may refer to:

Places

Australia 

 Palgrave, Queensland, a locality in the Southern Downs Region, Australia

Canada 

Palgrave, Ontario, Canada

United Kingdom 

Palgrave, Suffolk, England
Sporle with Palgrave, Norfolk, England

Others 

Palgrave (surname)
Palgrave Macmillan, an academic publishing company

See also
Count palatine
The New Palgrave: A Dictionary of Economics
Palgrave's Golden Treasury, a popular anthology of English poetry